Union Cemetery-Beatty Park is a site listed on the National Register of Historic Places in Steubenville, Ohio. Union Cemetery was incorporated as a not for profit in 1854, and through donations and purchase, additional land has been added. That part not suitable for a burial ground was used as a parkland.

This District was added to the National Register of Historic Places on February 27, 1987 for its landscape architecture. The address is 1720 W. Market St. And Lincoln Ave., Steubenville, Ohio.

Notable interments
Jimmy the Greek
See also :Category:Burials at Union Cemetery, (Steubenville, Ohio).

References

External links

National Register of Historic Places in Jefferson County, Ohio
Cemeteries in Jefferson County, Ohio
1854 establishments in Ohio
Steubenville, Ohio